Gastón Machín (born 20 February 1983) is an Argentine retired professional footballer who played as a midfielder.

Career
Machín is a product of the famous youth system at Argentinos Juniors, he made his senior debut for the club in 2002. In 2004, he was part of the squad that earned promotion to the Argentine Primera.

Machín played for Argentinos in the Primera until the end of 2005 when he signed for Independiente for the beginning of the Clausura 2006 tournament.

Machin was loaned to Newell's Old Boys but the club did not respect some issues with the contract in terms of money and Machin decided to go back to Independiente for the 2009 season.

In January 2010 Club Atlético Huracán signed the midfielder on loan for one year, with an option of deal extension and purchase.

On 26 June 2019 it was confirmed, that Machín had joined Spanish Segunda División B club Burgos CF on a 1-year contract. However, he announced his retirement on 12 January 2020.

References

External links
 Argentine Primera statistics  
 
 Football-Lineups player profile
 

1983 births
Living people
Sportspeople from Buenos Aires Province
Argentine footballers
Argentine expatriate footballers
Association football midfielders
Argentine Primera División players
Argentinos Juniors footballers
Club Atlético Independiente footballers
Newell's Old Boys footballers
Club Atlético Huracán footballers
Club Atlético Patronato footballers
Instituto footballers
Burgos CF footballers
Argentine expatriate sportspeople in Spain
Expatriate footballers in Spain